Jacek Bobrowicz (born 14 December 1962) is a Polish footballer. He played in one match for the Poland national football team in 1991.

References

External links
 
 

1962 births
Living people
Polish footballers
Poland international footballers
People from Świecie
Association football goalkeepers
Zawisza Bydgoszcz players
Zagłębie Sosnowiec players
Wisła Kraków players
Hutnik Nowa Huta players
RKS Radomsko players
Pelikan Łowicz players
Siarka Tarnobrzeg players